Chatillon (Issime ); is a town and comune in the Aosta Valley region of northwestern Italy.

Toponym 
Châtillon was renamed "Castiglion Dora" in Italian in 1939 during Fascist rule in Italy. It was reverted to its old name in 1946.

Notable people 
Châtillon is the ancestral home of the Bich family, whose most famous member was Marcel Bich, founder of Société Bic.

Hameaux 
Bourg, Breil-de-Barrel (or Petit-Breil), Gros Breil, Grand Frayan, Petit Frayan, Barma des Antesans, Setoret, Cret de Breil, Baron Gamba, Grange de Barme, Chaméran, Fours, Ventoux, Garin, Pavirola, Sez de Val, La Fournaise, Champlong, Conoz Dessus, Conoz Dessous, La Verdettaz, Murate, Isseuries, Perrianaz, Brusoncles des Gard (or Dessus), Brusoncles des Janin (or Dessous), Chardin, Bren, Boësse, Devies, Promiod, Boettes, Francou, Champlong, Arsine, Sopien, Brenvey, Champ, Chancellier, Chancellier Dessous, Chancellier Dessus, Revard, Pracarrà, Bioure, Salère, La Nouva, Giacomet, Varé, Chenez, Devies, Pointé, Étavé, Chesalet, Toniquet, Assert, Fontanella, Fressoney, Nissod, Travod, Nuarsa, Soletta, Domianaz, Closel Dessous, Closel Dessus, La Tour, Lo Cret, Verlex, Albard, Pissin Dessous, Pissin Dessus, La Sounere, Barmusse, Cretadonaz, Cret Blanc Dessous, Cret Blanc Dessus, Chavod, Merlin, Tour de Grange, Sarmasse, Barmafol, Plantin, Perolles, Soleil, Bretton, Saint-Valentin, Sellotaz, Govergnou, Cillod, Panorama, Remela, Neran, Larianaz, Gléréyaz, La Marca, Grand Prà, Crétaz, Cloîtres, Plan Pissin, Tornafol, Bertina, Gare, Saint-Clair, Piou, Cérouic, Étrop, Étrop Dessus, Pranego, Crétaz Chardon, Pragarin Dessous, Pragarin Dessus, Salé, Salé Dessus, Les Îles, Moriola, Taxard, Ussel, Château d'Ussel, Biolasse Dessous, Biolasse Dessus, Perry, Bellecombe, Mon Ross Dessus, Toule.

References 

Cities and towns in Aosta Valley